Shaskuh Rural District is a rural district (dehestan) in the Central District of Zirkuh County, South Khorasan Province, Iran. At the 2006 census, its population was 8,329, in 2,043 families.  The rural district has 16 villages.

References 

Rural Districts of South Khorasan Province
Zirkuh County